Gabriella Porpora (born 22 June 1942) is an Italian multimedia artist who works with paint, plexiglass, and wood.

Life 
Porpora was born in Rome to a Roman mother and a Neapolitan father, she founded with 12 other artists, the Gruppo 12 art movement. Her artwork can be inserted in the steps of Avant-garde art movements. Her artworks are experimental, often innovative.

She has sculpted original art-crafts called "Pictoscultures". She is still active in many exhibitions, primarily in Italy.

Selected works
In volo, SunShine and Seduction (2003)

References

External links
“The viewer has no choice but to surrender” – Discover Connekt Italian Artist: Gabriella Porpora
Gabriella Porpora's Personal Site

1942 births
Living people
Painters from Rome
Italian women painters
20th-century Italian women artists
21st-century Italian women artists